Chlapci v pasci is a song by Marika Gombitová released on OPUS in 1986.

The song, written by Gombitová along with her longtime text writer, Kamil Peteraj, became one the clubs favorite from Voľné miesto v srdci album, due to its catchy dancefloor tune. In 1986, the track won the annual Zlatý Triangel awards show as Best Video.

In addition, the composition was remixed by Jaroslav Šimek in 2008 for dancefloor and released as a free download single, followed by a Šimek's remix of "V období dažďa".

Official versions
 "Chlapci v pasci" - Studio version, 1986
 "Chlapci v pasci (Jaroslav Šimek Remix)" - Remixed version, 2008

Credits and personnel
 Marika Gombitová - lead vocal, writer
 Vašo Patejdl - Roland Jupiter 6, SCI Pro-One, Roland MC 202, Linn Drum
 Gabo Dušík - Roland Juno 60, Yamaha DX 7, Yamaha PF 15, piano
 Ján Szabo - bass
 Štefan Hegedüš - electric and acoustic guitar
 Juraj Varsanyi - Simmons drum
 Marián Jaslovský - tenor saxophone
 Ivan Jombík - programming, Yamaha drum computer RX 11, sound director
 Ján Lauko - producer
 Peter Smolinský - producer
 Štefan Danko - responsible editor

Awards

Triangel
Zlatý Triangel was an annual video chart also broadcast by the public television network Slovenská televízia from 1984 to 1997. The show, originally hosted by Tatiana Kulíšková and Pavol Juráň, and since November 1989 by Daniel Junas, awarded exclusively Slovak and Czech artists for the best videos released in a calendar year, similarly as the MTV music channel. Prior to that, its monthly editions called Triangel were held. In total, Gombitová won four annual charts (in 1985-86, 1988 and 1995).

References

General

Specific

External links 
 

1986 songs
Marika Gombitová songs
Songs written by Marika Gombitová
Songs written by Kamil Peteraj
Slovak-language songs